Alan Pichot (born 13 August 1998) is an Argentine chess player. He was awarded the title of Grandmaster by FIDE in 2016.

Chess career
Pichot was Argentine champion at the U10, U12, U14 and U18 levels, achieving the latter victory at the age of 12. He became the Pan American under 10 champion in 2008 and as a result, he was awarded the title of FIDE Master. In 2014, he won the U16 section of the World Youth Chess Championships with a score of 9/11 points (+9–2=0), half a point ahead of the rest of the field. He earned the grandmaster title in 2016, aged 17.

In July 2019, Pichot placed fifth in the American Continental Chess Championship with a score of 8/11 (+6–1=4), thus qualifying for the FIDE World Cup 2019.

In 2022, Pichot won the Magistral 50 Aniversario Torre Blanca tournament in Buenos Aires with a score of 8/9 (+7–0=2)

Pichot has represented Argentina at the Chess Olympiad since 2016. He was on the reserve board at the 42nd Chess Olympiad, scoring 5½/8 (+3–0=5). He played on fourth board at the 43rd Chess Olympiad, and scored 5½/9 (+4–2=3).

References

External links
 
 
 
 

1998 births
Living people
Argentine chess players
Chess grandmasters
Chess Olympiad competitors
Sportspeople from Buenos Aires
World Youth Chess Champions